William Paget, 5th Baron Paget (13 September 1609 –  19 October 1678) was an English peer. He was born at Beaudesert House, Staffordshire, England to William Paget, 4th Baron Paget and Lettice Knollys.

Career
He was a Parliamentarian with land in Buckinghamshire. At the outbreak of the English Civil War in 1641, he was made the Parliamentarian Lord Lieutenant of Buckinghamshire. However the following year he swapped sides to become a Royalist under King Charles I and so was dismissed from that role and replaced by Philip Wharton, 4th Baron Wharton.

Family
On 28 June 1632 Paget married Lady Frances Rich, daughter of Henry Rich, 1st Earl of Holland and Isabel Cope. From 1637 to 1643 they lived at 43 King Street, Covent Garden.
William and Frances had ten children:
William Paget, 6th Baron Paget (10 February 1637 – 25 February 1713) married (1) Frances Pierrepont (2) Isabella Irby
Henry Paget (born c. 1643) married (1) 29 March 1684 Mary O'Rorke, daughter of Hugh O'Rorke and Joan Reynolds, (2) Mary or Anne Sandford, or vice versa, and had by Mary O'Rorke:
Brigadier General Thomas Paget (died 1741), Governor of Menorca, married Mary Whitcombe; their daughter Caroline Paget (died 7 February 1766) married in 1737 Sir Nicholas Bayly, 2nd Baronet
Thomas Paget (born c. 1645)
Isabella Paget (born c. 1647)
Lettice Paget (born c. 1649) married Richard Hampden
Elizabeth Paget (born c. 1651)
Frances Paget (born c. 1653) married Rowland Hunt
Penelope Paget (born c. 1655) married Philip Foley. They are ancestors of Charles Darwin.
Diana Paget (born c. 1657 died 1707) married Henry Ashhurst
Anne Paget (born c. 1659)

References
thepeerage.com Accessed March 3, 2009
family search.org Accessed March 3, 2009

Paget, William, 5th Baron
Paget, William, 5th Baron
Paget, William Paget, 5th Baron
Paget, William Paget, 5th Baron
Paget, William Paget, 5th Baron
William
Barons Paget